Roy Asberry Cooper III (born June 13, 1957) is an American attorney and politician, serving as the 75th governor of North Carolina since 2017. A member of the Democratic Party, he served as the 49th attorney general of North Carolina from 2001 to 2017 and in the North Carolina General Assembly in both the House of Representatives and Senate between 1987 and 2001.

Cooper defeated Republican incumbent Pat McCrory for the governorship in a close race in the 2016 election. On December 5, McCrory conceded the election, making Cooper the first challenger to defeat a sitting governor in the state's history. Cooper took office on January 1, 2017. The Republican-dominated legislature passed bills in a special session before he took office to reduce the power of the governor's office. The legislature has overridden several of his vetoes of legislation. Cooper was reelected in 2020, defeating Republican nominee and Lieutenant Governor Dan Forest.

Early life and education
Roy Asberry Cooper III was born on June 13, 1957, in Nashville, North Carolina to Beverly Batchelor and Roy Asberry Cooper II. His mother was a teacher and his father a lawyer. Cooper attended public school and worked on his parents' tobacco farm during summer. He graduated from Northern Nash High School in 1975. He received the Morehead Scholarship at the University of North Carolina at Chapel Hill for his undergraduate studies. As an undergraduate at UNC, he was a member of Chi Psi Fraternity. He was elected president of the university's Young Democrats. He earned a Juris Doctor degree from the University of North Carolina School of Law in 1982.

State legislature

Cooper was elected to the North Carolina House of Representatives in 1986, defeating longtime incumbent Allen Barbee in the Democratic primary. He drew little attention to himself during his first term aside from resolving a school merger dispute in Nash County. He continued to practice law while serving in the legislature. In 1989, Cooper joined Republicans and dissident Democrats to unseat Speaker Liston B. Ramsey. That year he also voted alongside all House Republicans and 15 Democrats in favor of an unsuccessful attempt to amend the constitution to grant the governor veto power over legislation.

Cooper was appointed to the North Carolina Senate in 1991 to serve the remainder of a term of a senator who had vacated his seat. In 1995 Republicans secured a majority of the seats in the House of Representatives. He then negotiated a compromise bill to schedule a referendum to amend the constitution and grant the governor veto power. In 1997, Cooper was elected majority leader of the State Senate. He continued to practice law as the managing partner of Fields & Cooper in Rocky Mount and Nashville, North Carolina.

North Carolina Attorney General

Elections
Cooper was elected North Carolina attorney general in November 2000, defeating Republican lawyer Dan Boyce and Reform Party candidate Margaret Palms. He took office on January 6, 2001; he was reelected in 2004. Cooper was mentioned as a possible Democratic candidate for governor in 2008, but decided to run for reelection as attorney general instead. He was easily reelected, defeating Republican Bob Crumley and garnering more votes than any other statewide candidate in the 2008 attorney general election.

Both state and national Democrats attempted to recruit him to run against Republican U.S. Senator Richard Burr in 2010, but he declined. In 2012, politicians suggested him as a possible candidate for governor of North Carolina after incumbent Governor Bev Perdue announced her retirement, but Cooper declined to run. His political consultant announced in 2011 that Cooper would seek a fourth term in 2012. He was unopposed in both the Democratic primary and the general election. In the November 2012 elections, Cooper received 2,828,941 votes.

Tenure

In January 2007, when Durham District Attorney Mike Nifong asked to be recused from dealing with the Duke lacrosse case, Cooper's office assumed responsibility for the case. On April 11, 2007, after revelations of Nifong's withholding of evidence, fabrications, and other ethics violations, Cooper dismissed the case against the Duke lacrosse team players, taking the extraordinary step of declaring them "innocent" and victims of a "tragic rush to accuse". The decision won him bipartisan praise. Two days after the 2007 Virginia Tech shooting, he created the Campus Safety Task Force to analyze school shootings and make policy recommendations to help the government prevent and respond to them. The committee delivered its report to him in January 2008. After the release of the task force's findings, Cooper assisted members of the North Carolina General Assembly in passing a law that required court clerks to record involuntary commitments in a national gun permit database.

After a 2010 decision by a three-judge panel to exonerate Gregory Taylor, who had served nearly 17 years for the first-degree murder of Jaquetta Thomas, Cooper ordered an audit after it was learned that officials at the North Carolina State Bureau of Investigation forensic lab had withheld information. This suppression of evidence had contributed to Taylor's conviction for murder. The audit was released in 2010; it found that it had been common practice for two decades for a select group of agents at the State Bureau of Investigation to withhold information. In addition, they did not keep up with scientific standards and the latest tests. The two investigators, Chris Swecker and Micheal Fox, cited almost 230 cases that were tainted by these actions. Three people convicted in such cases had been executed; 80 defendants convicted were still in prison. A massive state effort was undertaken to follow up on their cases.

In 2011 Cooper argued his first case before the United States Supreme Court, J. D. B. v. North Carolina, a case related to Miranda rights in juvenile cases. The Court ruled 5–4 against North Carolina.

Governor of North Carolina

Elections

2016

Cooper ran for governor of North Carolina in the 2016 election against incumbent Republican Pat McCrory. In March 2016, the North Carolina General Assembly passed the Public Facilities Privacy & Security Act—commonly known as "House Bill 2"—which McCrory signed into law. Numerous corporations began boycotting the state in protest of the law, cancelling job investment and expansion plans. Cooper denounced the law as unconstitutional and refused to defend it in court in his capacity as attorney general.

As a result of the economic damage the law caused, McCrory's approval rating fell dramatically in the months before the election. When initial election results showed Cooper leading, McCrory claimed without evidence that the election had been manipulated by voter fraud. Recounts resulted in slightly higher margins of victory for Cooper, and after an extended legal battle, McCrory conceded the election on December 5. Out of 4.7 million total ballots, Cooper won by 10,227 votes.

2020

On December 5, 2019, Cooper announced his candidacy for reelection. He won the November 3 election, defeating Republican nominee Lieutenant Governor Dan Forest by 4.4 points.

Transition 
Dismayed by Cooper's win, the General Assembly passed special legislation before he was inaugurated to reduce the power of the governor's office. In what The New York Times described as a "surprise special session", Republican legislators moved to strip Cooper's powers before he assumed the governorship. Throughout December, Cooper oversaw an attempt to repeal the Public Facilities Privacy & Security Act. The repeal attempt failed after a deal between state Republican and Democratic lawmakers and Charlotte officials fell apart.

Tenure 

Cooper was sworn in as governor on January 1, 2017, in a small ceremony. His planned public inauguration was canceled due to a snowstorm.

After taking office, as of January 6, 2017, Cooper requested federal approval for Medicaid coverage expansion in North Carolina. Effective January 15, a federal judge halted Cooper's request, an order that expired on January 29. In his first months in office, Cooper focused on repealing the Public Facilities Privacy & Security Act. After long negotiations with Republican state legislators, Cooper agreed in late March to sign a law prohibiting North Carolina cities from passing local ordinances pertaining to public accommodations or employment practices for three years in exchange for the reversal of the facilities act. On May 9, 2017, President Donald Trump appointed Cooper to a commission tasked with reducing opioid addiction.

After the Supreme Court of the United States declared North Carolina's legislative maps unconstitutional, Cooper called for a special redistricting session on June 7, 2017, but the House and Senate canceled the session, calling it unconstitutional. On June 29, Cooper signed the STOP Act, an overhaul of the prescribing and dispensing regulations of opioids.

On July 1, Cooper signed a bill to allow alcohol sales after 10 AM on Sundays, nicknamed the "Brunch Bill". On July 11, he signed "Britny's Law", which states a homicide is first-degree murder if the killing was committed with malice and the defendant has been convicted of domestic violence or stalking the victim. He also signed two bills to allow domestic violence protective orders granted by a judge to fully go into effect even when they are under appeal and to expand the state's "revenge porn" law from cases involving former lovers to those involving strangers. On July 12, Cooper signed a bill that would add lessons on what to do when pulled over by law enforcement to the state's driver's education curriculum. The bill passed both chambers unanimously.

On July 26, 2017, Cooper signed a bill to mount cameras on school buses in order to reduce drivers who illegally pass stopped school buses. On August 31, 2017, he declared a state of emergency due to plummeting gas supply, which was rescinded on September 18.

Cooper's fellow Appalachian governors elected him co-chair of the Appalachian Regional Commission for 2019, making him the first North Carolina governor to co-chair the ARC since Jim Hunt in 1978. In the 2018 elections, the Republican Party lost seats in the General Assembly, ending its supermajorities in both houses and rendering it unable to override gubernatorial vetoes. On March 6, 2019, Cooper proposed a $25.2 billion budget for the year. It included salary increases for public school teachers and state workers, expansion of Medicaid, and a $3.9 billion bond (subject to a referendum) to help fund school construction and local infrastructure projects. Cooper said that he was confident he could get the legislature, without enough Republican members to override a veto, to implement some of his ideas.

On March 10, 2020, Cooper declared a state of emergency in North Carolina due to the COVID-19 pandemic. Four days later, he issued an executive order banning gatherings of over 100 people, and closed all K-12 schools for two weeks.

Vetoes
During his first two years in office, Cooper faced a Republican supermajority in the General Assembly capable of overriding his vetoes, thereby limiting his legislative influence. His first veto as governor was of a bill that would make elections to the North Carolina Superior Court and to the District Court partisan, after being conducted on a nonpartisan basis for many years. The House overrode the veto on March 22, 2017. The Senate followed suit on March 23, resulting in the bill becoming law over Cooper's objection.

Cooper vetoed a bill on April 21, 2017, to reduce the size of the North Carolina Court of Appeals by three judges. The veto was overridden on April 26. He also vetoed a bill on April 21, 2017, that would create a new State Board of Elections (and new county boards of elections) split evenly between the Republicans and the Democrats. It would replace the longstanding system that gave the governor's party a majority on the board. Both houses of the legislature voted to override the veto on April 24 and 25.

Cooper also vetoed a bill that would limit individuals' ability to sue hog farms. This veto was also overridden by the legislature. On June 27, Cooper vetoed the proposed state budget, which he had called "irresponsible" the day before. In his veto message, Cooper cited the budget's income tax cuts and argued it "lacks structural integrity by failing to account for population growth, inflation and looming federal reductions, by using one-time revenue for recurring expenses, and by adopting a tax plan that will cause the state to fail to fund promised teacher salary increases in future years" and the proposed bill included "provisions that infringe upon the governor's ability to faithfully execute the laws, including the administration of this Act, as required by the Constitution, and violating the separation of powers". The legislature overrode his veto the next day.

In July 2017, Cooper vetoed a bill to authorize nonprofit organizations to operate "game nights", saying it would unintentionally create a new opportunity for the video poker industry.

In December 2018, the North Carolina General Assembly passed a bill that would require new primary elections if a do-over election was called in the 9th district election. Cooper vetoed the bill due to a provision that made campaign finance investigations less public, but the General Assembly overrode his veto. In total, during his first two years in office, Cooper vetoed 28 bills, 23 of which were overridden by the legislature. As a result of the 2018 legislative elections, the Republicans lost their supermajority in the General Assembly, thus giving Cooper and legislative Democrats more leverage in legislative negotiations.

In May 2019, Cooper vetoed a bill that proposed punishments in the form of prison time and fines against physicians and nurses who do not resuscitate newborns that survive an abortion. He said that the "bill is an unnecessary interference between doctors and their patients" and that laws "already protect newborn babies".

Personal life

Roy Cooper is married to Kristin Cooper (née Bernhardt), who worked as a guardian ad litem for foster children in Wake County. They have three daughters, who all graduated from the University of North Carolina at Chapel Hill. They reside in the Executive Mansion. Cooper has taught Sunday school classes, serving as a deacon and elder at White Memorial Presbyterian Church, and is an avid fan of the NHL's Carolina Hurricanes.

Electoral history 

|}

References

Works cited

External links

Governor Roy Cooper official government website
Roy Cooper for Governor campaign website

|-

|-

|-

|-

|-

|-

|-

|-

|-

|-

 

1957 births
20th-century American lawyers
20th-century American politicians
21st-century American lawyers
21st-century American politicians
American Presbyterians
Christians from North Carolina
Democratic Party governors of North Carolina
Living people
Democratic Party members of the North Carolina House of Representatives
North Carolina Attorneys General
North Carolina lawyers
Democratic Party North Carolina state senators
People from Nashville, North Carolina
University of North Carolina School of Law alumni
University of North Carolina at Chapel Hill alumni